Electric Universe is the thirteenth studio album by American band Earth, Wind & Fire, released in November 1983 on Columbia Records. The album rose to No. 8 on the US Billboard Top Soul Albums chart and No. 40 on the US Billboard 200 chart. Electric Universe also reached No. 17 on the Swedish Pop Albums chart, No. 18 on the UK Blues & Soul Top British Soul Albums chart, No. 20 on the Japanese Pop Albums chart and No. 22 on both the Dutch Pop Albums and Swiss Pop Albums charts.

Overview
Electric Universe was produced by Maurice White for Kalimba Productions.
With the album came a unique new wave and synth-pop sound for the band.

Artists such as David Foster, Martin Page, Michel Colombier and Pamela Hutchinson and Wanda Vaughn of The Emotions featured upon the album. The album was also reissued in 2015 with six bonus tracks and two demos.

As well, Electric Universe was featured in an August 2016 episode of Mass Appeal's YouTube series Rhythm Roulette.

Singles
The lead single, "Magnetic" peaked at No. 10 on the Billboard Hot R&B Singles chart and No. 36 on the Billboard Hot Dance Club Play chart. "Touch" reached No. 23 on the Billboard Hot R&B Singles chart and No. 36 on the Billboard Adult Contemporary Songs chart.

Critical reception

Gary Graff of the Detroit Free Press exclaimed "Plug in the planets! This is the best disc this outfit has put together in quite some time." Lennox Samuels of the Dallas Morning News declared that "Electric Universe (Columbia) shows the bands resilience. Unlike the previous offering Powerlight this LP should please fans." Samuels added "Although most of the cuts here are characterized by mellow overtures, midway through the disc, colourful kalimba choruses and airy harmonies capture the high spirits of this nine member aggregation". Although calling it a "letdown" Robert Christgau of the Village Voice gave the album a B grade.  Roger Catlin of the Omaha World Herald gave the album a four out of five star rating and declared EWF "seems to be trying to continue to branch out under leader Maurice White. Catlin also stated "he's testing out yet another theory for worldwide unity too, on Electric Universe in which electricity or magnetism plays a big role in getting everybody together - perhaps through static cling". With a three out of five stars review Matty Karas of Rolling Stone described Electric Universe as being full of "sensuous, and at times, rock oriented dance material". Pam Lambert of The Wall Street Journal exclaimed "after more than a decade together, Earth, Wind & Fire continue to chart new ground; their current album, "Electric Universe" (Columbia), deserves to win this black supergroup even more of a crossover audience than it has enjoyed in the past." Phyl Garland of Stereo Review wrote "Although 'Electric Universe' does not scintillate with Earth, Wind & Fire's usual brilliance, it's skilfully crafted and worth a listen". Garland noted that EW&F's performance was "not among their best" but called the album a "very good recording". Rick Shefchik of Knight Ridder gave the album a 7/10 rating stating "Fearing more of Maurice White's cosmic pablum, I was glad to notice the shift to concrete r&b on Side One, while the band retains its breathy mix of horns and voices". Shefchik added "White relinquished his songwriting role on the first three songs, and even the ones he did write seem to benefit from a less starry-eyed perspective. Unless, of course, you count Electric Nation and Spirit of a New World." Prentis Rogers of the Atlanta Journal-Constitution wrote "In fact, the entire album holds up well lyrically and musically with a noticeable but not overpowering rock flavour. It may not signal a return to the group's standard of staying a note or two ahead of its contemporaries, but this is EWF's best album in recent years." 
Robert Palmer of The New York Times proclaimed that "the rich vocal harmonies and lapidary pop craftsmanship listeners have learned to expect from Earth, Wind & Fire are still in evidence, but the group's instrumental sound has been radically stripped down and rethought."

Don McLeese of The Chicago Sun Times also gave Electric Universe an honourable mention in his list of the top ten albums of 1983.

Track listing

Credits
Backing vocals - Beloyd Taylor, Pamela Hutchinson & Wanda Vaughn
Bass Guitar - Verdine White
Drums, percussion - Fred White
Engineer [Assistant] – Barbara Rooney, Murray Dvorkin
Engineer, Mixed By – Mick Guzauski
Rhythm Guitar - Roland Bautista
Keyboards - Brian Fairweather, David Foster, Larry Dunn, Martin Page, Michel Colombier, Robbie Buchanan, Wayne Vaughn
Lead & backing vocals - Philip Bailey
Lead & backing vocals, drums, kalimba - Maurice White
Mastered By – Bernie Grundman
Mixed By – George Massenburg
Percussion - Ralph Johnson
Piano - Larry Dunn
Saxophone - Andrew Woolfolk
Simmons drums - John Gilston

Reissue
Coordinator [Artist/Musician Interview] – Randy Mahon
Coordinator [Reissue] – Jeff James
Coordinator [Release] – Craig Turnbull
Design [Package Design] – Roger Williams
Liner Notes, Research – Alex Henderson
Mastered By – Sean Brennan 
Production Manager [Reissue] – Matt Murphy
Reissue Producer – Tony Culvert

Charts

Sales

References

1983 albums
Earth, Wind & Fire albums
Albums produced by Maurice White
New wave albums by American artists
Synth-pop albums by American artists
Columbia Records albums